Lophoplusia giffardi is a moth of the family Noctuidae. It was first described by Otto Herman Swezey in 1913. It is endemic to the Hawaiian islands of Molokai, Maui and Hawaii.

External links

Endemic moths of Hawaii
Plusiinae